Cross Mountain is a ghost town in Moffat County, in the U.S. state of Colorado.

Cross Mountain was established sometime after 1910, and it was deserted sometime before 1960. The town got its name from a nearby mesa, also named Cross Mountain. The mesa is contained within a wilderness study area and is owned by the Bureau of Land Management.

References

Ghost towns in Colorado
Towns in Moffat County, Colorado